John Raymond Strzykalski (December 14, 1921 – June 19, 2002) was an American football halfback for the San Francisco 49ers of the National Football League (NFL).  He was drafted out of Marquette University by the Green Bay Packers in the 1946 NFL Draft.

References

External links
 

1921 births
2002 deaths
American football halfbacks
Marquette Golden Avalanche football players
San Francisco 49ers (AAFC) players
San Francisco 49ers players
Second Air Force Superbombers football players
Western Conference Pro Bowl players
Players of American football from Milwaukee